George Leland may refer to:
 Mickey Leland (George Thomas Leland, 1944–1989), anti-poverty activist and later congressman
 George W. Leland (1834–1880), Medal of Honor recipient
 George Adams Leland (1850–1924), American medical doctor and pedagogue